In agricultural and environmental policy, green payments refers to payments made to producers as compensation for environmental benefits that accrue as a result of or in conjunction with their farming activities. These environmental benefits can include protecting wetland as too improve filtration or maintaining soil quality to provide a carbon sink.

The Conservation Security Program, authorized in the 2002 farm bill (P.L. 107-171, Sec. 2001- 2006), generally is viewed as the first green payments program in the United States, paying producers to provide conservation benefits on land from which food and fiber are being produced.

References

United States Department of Agriculture
Environment of the United States